The Big Roar is the debut album by Welsh rock band the Joy Formidable, released in the UK on 24 January 2011 on Atlantic Records, with a US release following on 15 March 2011. The tracks "Austere", "Cradle", "Whirring" and "The Greatest Light Is the Greatest Shade" were originally featured on the band's debut mini album A Balloon Called Moaning. These songs were re-recorded for The Big Roar.

Background and recording
In summer 2010, the band signed with Canvasback Records, a subsidiary of Atlantic. The band worked on writing and tracking the material for The Big Roar when they were not on tour. The album was recorded in London.

On the album, bassist Rhydian Dafydd said that "(it) covers a lot of emotional range. It's captured the battle between the eternal optimist and the manic depressive". Their debut was produced by the band, with help from engineer Neak Menter. The band traveled to Los Angeles to mix it with producer Rich Costey, who had worked with bands such as Mew, Muse, Foo Fighters and Glasvegas. The first single from those sessions, "I Don't Want to See You Like This", was released in the autumn of 2010. The Japanese release of the album contains three exclusive bonus tracks.

Critical reception

The Big Roar has received mostly positive reviews. The album currently has a 77 out of 100 on the review aggregate site Metacritic, which indicates "generally favorable reviews."

Reviewer Mike Haydock  of BBC Music praised the album, calling it "a fantastic debut". Lisa Wright of NME also gave the album a positive review, writing, "The Big Roar is the kind of epic-yet-intimate debut that does exactly what its title makes out in the most tactful of styles; an LP that ultimately delivers on every count on the four years of promise leading up to it". In another positive review, Clash wrote of the album: "Bolt on an undeniably zealous execution, a set of simple yet well-written songs, add an element of confident adventure via some experimentation and diversity and the rebirth of indie may just have found its leading protagonists".

In a more mixed review, Stuart Berman of Pitchfork criticized the album for being excessive, writing, "There's no denying the Joy Formidable's passion, vigor, and pop smarts; it would just be easier to appreciate those qualities if The Big Roar didn't so often sound like a big blur". Jason Keller of Now Magazine agreed, writing, "The immediate criticism about this long-in-the-making debut... is that there’s too much big, as the title suggests".

Track listing

Personnel
The Joy Formidable
 Ritzy Bryan – Vocals, guitar
 Rhydian Dafydd – Bass, vocals (10)
 Matt Thomas – Drums

Production
 Rich Costey – Mixing, producer
 Neak Menter – Mixing, producer

Design personnel
 Rhydian Dafydd - Illustrations 
 Jeremy Cowart – Photography
 Danny North – Photography
 Alex Kirzhner – Layout

Charts

References

External links
 Official band website

2011 debut albums
Atlantic Records albums
The Joy Formidable albums